Loyd King (born May 29, 1949) is a former professional basketball player. He played two seasons in the American Basketball Association (ABA).

Biography
King was born Loyd Harold King in Asheville, North Carolina on May 29, 1949. He played high school basketball at Clyde A. Erwin High School in Asheville, North Carolina. He played at the collegiate level at Virginia Tech, and was inducted into the school's sports hall of fame in 1998.

King played two seasons in the American Basketball Association for the Memphis Pros/Tams. Previously, he had been drafted by the Milwaukee Bucks in the fifteenth round of the 1971 NBA draft.

References

1949 births
Living people
American men's basketball players
Basketball players from North Carolina
Memphis Pros players
Memphis Tams players
Milwaukee Bucks draft picks
Sportspeople from Asheville, North Carolina
Virginia Tech Hokies men's basketball players